Peter Albert Leslie Chapman-Rietschi (1945-2017) was an independent scholar and research writer in the field of history of astronomy, ancient astral sciences, archaeoastronomy, and astrobiology, including bioastronomy and SETI.

He was a Fellow of the Royal Astronomical Society  and in former years also Fellow of the Royal Astronomical Society of Canada and Member of the Egypt Exploration Society.

Publications 
Pre-telescopic Astronomy: Invisible 'Planets' Rahu and Ketu. Quarterly Journal of the Royal Astronomical Society, 32, 53–55, 1991
The Plurality of Worlds. The Observatory, 111, 312, 1991
The Fronties of Life. The Observatory, 112, 145, 1992
Nonclassical SETI. The Observatory, 114, 175, 1994
The Beijing Ancient Observatory and Intercultural Contacts. The Journal of the Royal Astronomical Society of Canada, 88, 24–38, 1994
The Colour of Sirius in Ancient Times. Quarterly Journal of the Royal Astronomical Society, 36, 337–350, 1995
Astronomers and Missionaries in Old Beijing. Quarterly Journal of the Royal Astronomical Society, 36, 273-274, 1995
The Privatized World of SETI. The Observatory, 115, 135, 1995
The Star seen in the East. The Observatory, 115, 329-330, 1995
Venus as the Star of Bethlehem. Quarterly Journal of the Royal Astronomical Society, 37, 843-844, 1996
Astronomical Conceptions in Mithraic Iconography. The Journal of the Royal Astronomical Society of Canada, 91, 133-134, 1997
SETI, Forty Years on. The Observatory, 120, 403-404, 2000
The beginnings of SETI. Astronomy & Geophysics, 44, 1.7, 2003
Astrobiology. The Observatory, 127, 191, 2007
The First SETI Scans. The Observatory, 130, 172-173, 2010
Factor L of the Drake Equation. The Observatory, 131, 391-392, 2011
The Colour Black and the Planet Saturn. The Observatory, 133, 41–42, 2013

Book Reviews 
Extraterrestrials. Where Are They?, B. Zuckerman and M.H. Hart. Cambridge University Press. The Observatory, 116, 182–183, 1996
The Sirius Mystery, R. Temple. Century London. The Observatory, 118, 245-246, 1998
Astrobiology: Future Perspectives, P. Ehrenfreund et al. Kluwer-Springer Dordrecht  The Observatory, 125, 278–279, 2005
Contact with Alien Civilisations, M.A.G. Michaud. Springer Heidelberg. The Observatory, 127, 341–342, 2007
The Living Cosmos, C. Impey. Cambridge University Press. The Observatory, 132, 45–46, 2012
We are the Martians: Connecting Cosmology with Biology, G.F. Bignami. Springer Heidelberg. The Observatory, 133, 108–109, 2013
Signatures of Life: Science Searches the Universe, E. Ashpole. Prometheus Arnherst. The Observatory, 133, 370, 2013
Elephants in Space: The Past, Present and Future of Life and the Universe, B. Moore. Springer Heidelberg. The Observatory, 135, 108–109, 2015
Astrobiological Neurosystems, J.L. Cranford. Springer Heidelberg. The Observatory, 136, 93–95, 2016
The Hunt for Alien Life: A Wider Perspective, P. Linde. Springer Heidelberg. The Observatory, 137, 86–87, 2017

Conference Papers 
Frontiers of Life. 3rd 'Rencontres de Blois', October 1991 (summary of bioastronomy talks). The Observatory, 112, 145–147, 1992
Philosophy, Star Transformations and Okeanos. 3rd Conference of the 'International Association Cosmos and Philosophy' (IACP) 1991, Mytilene. In: Diotima, Institut de Philosophie de l'Université d'Athènes, J. Vrin, Paris, 21, 83–86, 1993.
Sappho and the Astral Sciences, co-work with Anne Chapman-Rietschi. In: 14th Conference of the 'Société Européenne pour l'Astronomie dans la Culture' (SEAC) 2006, Rhodes and 17th IACP 2007, Athens. In: Ordre et Liberté: L'Univers Cosmique et Human, I.P.R. Athènes, 123–128, 2011, and In:  Philosophia, Academy of Athens, 42, 75–79, 2012
Catherine of Alexandria and the Art of Sacred Astronomy, co-work with Anne Chapman-Rietschi. In: 19th IACP 2010, Athens. In: Ordre et Liberté: L'Univers Cosmique et Human, I.P.R. Athènes, 159–167, 2011, and In: Diotima, Institut de Philosophie de l'Université d'Athènes, J. Vrin, Paris, 41, 153–161, 2013.
Other Worlds, Other Life. 11th IACP 2000, Prague. In: Cosmological Viewpoints, St. Kliment Ohridski University Press, Sofia, 138–140, 2015.
ETI and Humankind. 12th IACP 2001, Aegina. In : Cosmological Viewpoints, St. Kliment Ohridski University Press, Sofia, 189–192, 2015.

Key to conferences 
IACP = International Association Cosmos and Philosophy
INSAP = The Inspiration of Astronomical Phenomena
SEAC = Société pour l'Astronomie dans la Culture

References 

1945 births
2017 deaths
Historians of astronomy
Fellows of the Royal Astronomical Society